The Seven Wonders of Portuguese Origin in the World are a list of seven significant landmarks across the world which were built by the Portuguese during the six centuries of the Portuguese Empire (1415-1999). The competition was held in conjunction with the Ministry of Culture of Portugal and the Portuguese Institute for Architectural Heritage.

The objective of the list and competition was to promote the architectural heritage and legacy of the Portuguese across the world. A commission pre-selected 27 notable monuments of Portuguese origin from 16 countries across Asia, Africa, and the Americas. The results of the competition were announced at a ceremony at the Portugal Day celebrations in 2010.

Seven Wonders

Map

Finalists
The 20 finalists for the competition were:

References

External links
7 Maravilhas de Origem Portuguesa no Mundo

2009 in Portugal
P